Rough Weather is the 36th book in Robert B. Parker's  Spenser series and first published in 2008.

Spenser is hired as a bodyguard at an exclusive wedding, and witnesses the kidnapping of the bride.

References

2008 American novels
American detective novels
Spenser (novel series)
Novels about kidnapping